Joachim Drews (born 30 June 1980) is a German lightweight rower. He won a gold medal at the 2003 World Rowing Championships in Milan with the lightweight men's eight.

References

1980 births
Living people
German male rowers
World Rowing Championships medalists for Germany